Garden City is an unincorporated community in St. Mary Parish, Louisiana, United States. Garden City had a post office until it closed on September 24, 2011; it still has its own ZIP code, 70540.

Education
Garden City is served by the Centerville School (K-12) of the St. Mary Parish School Board, located in Centerville.

References

Unincorporated communities in St. Mary Parish, Louisiana
Unincorporated communities in Louisiana